Sokol (German Falkenberg) is a cone-shaped peak in the Lusatian Mountains, just south of the frontier between Germany and the Czech Republic. There are traces at the summit of a medieval castle—Starý Falkenburk (Alte Falkenburg).

References

Mountains and hills of the Czech Republic
Mountain ranges of the Czech Republic
Lusatian Mountains
Jablonné v Podještědí